Suha pri Predosljah is a village north of Kranj in the Upper Carniola region of Slovenia.

Name
The name of the settlement was changed from Suha to Suha  pri Predosljah in 1953. In the past the German name was Sucha.

Church
The local church is dedicated to Saint Stephen.

References

External links

Suha pri Predosljah on Geopedia

Populated places in the City Municipality of Kranj